KIVA (1600 kHz) is a commercial AM radio station licensed to Albuquerque, New Mexico.  It is owned by the Rock of Talk LLC and airs a talk radio format.   Studios and offices are located at 2309 Renard Place Southeast, near the Albuquerque International Sunport.

KIVA broadcasts with 10,000 watts by day.  To protect other stations on 1600 AM at night, it reduces power to 175 watts.  The transmitter tower is on Arno Street, near Interstate 25, about a mile from the studios.

Programming
On weekdays, KIVA carries mostly nationally syndicated conservative talk shows.  They include Glenn Beck, Brian Kilmeade, Bill O'Reilly, Sean Hannity, Ben Shapiro, Buck Sexton and "Coast to Coast AM with George Noory."  KIVA also features a local afternoon show called "The Rock of Talk" with Eddy Aragon from 4:00 to 6:45 pm.  Aragon has been named the Albuquerque Journal Readers Choice Winner for Radio Personality for the last four years from 2017 to 2020.

Weekend hosts include Bill Handel, Alex Jones, and "Ground Zero with Clyde Lewis." Saturdays are dedicated to business talk with local broadcasts from 10:00 am to 5:00 pm.  On Sundays, Christian talk and teaching programs including Hometown Heroes and The Lutheran Hour and the live Sunday edition of The Alex Jones Show as well as Free Talk Live on Saturday and Sunday evenings.  There is no brokered programming.

KIVA brands itself as "Fox News ABQ.FM." Hourly news updates are provided by Fox News Radio as well as bottom of the hour business updates on weekdays from Fox Business.  The station broadcasts via its MP3 streams which can be accessed at www.abq.fm. It also broadcasts in an MP3 format.  You can also find Rock of Talk on Roku, Amazon Fire and Apple Plus TV.  To watch the stream live go to www.rockoftalk.tv.

History
On June 6, 1956, the station first signed on as KHAM.  It originally was a daytimer on AM 1580, required to go off the air at sunset to avoid interfering with other stations.

It had a classic country format as KRLL from 1993 to 1995 and was the home of Radio Disney as KDZZ from October 1997 to July 1999, but for many years was an AM simulcast for Oldies station "Kool 102" KZKL-FM (101.7).

In 2000, the Federal Communications Commission authorized the station to move from AM 1580, a Canadian clear channel frequency where the Albuquerque station could not broadcast at night, to AM 1600, a regional frequency which would allow it to broadcast around the clock.  The station switched to an all-news format as KIVA from 2000 to 2002 after the frequency switch. 1600 began an oldies format as KRKE in early 2005 after stunting with an all Elvis format for a couple of weeks at the end of 2004. The talk format for KIVA began on June 15, 2009 on 1550 AM. On August 28, 2012 KIVA swapped frequencies with KRKE moving KIVA to 1600, while KRKE switched from 1600 to 1550.

1600 had previously been "The mix of New Mexico" as KANM.

The station was assigned the call sign KNUS on 1988-11-05. On 1989-09-27, the station changed its call sign to KZKL, on 1993-11-01 to KRLL, on 1995-11-01 to KNOS, on 1996-06-14 to KZKL, on 1997-11-28 to KDZZ, on 1999-09-13 to KIVA, on 2002-10-22 to KANM, on 2005-04-01 to KRKE, and on 2012-08-28 to the current KIVA.

FM Broadcast
KIVA first began broadcasting in June 2013 on FM translator station K240BL 95.9 MHz in Albuquerque. The translator signal was upgraded to the maximum 250 watts from 47 watts in September 2014. In March 2017 KIVA began broadcasting on K229CL 93.7 which had previously aired 1240 KDSK (AM) until it moved to 92.9 which is owned by the same company.

In April 2017 95.9 went silent. On January 1, 2021 the 93.7 translator went silent while all references to it were removed from the stations' website and social media pages months before the time it went silent. A recent FCC filing states that the owner (Telebeeper of New Mexico) is negotiating with another station for rebroadcast on the translator. KIVA continues to be heard on AM 1600 where it has been since 2011 and the website at www.rockoftalk.com.

References

External links
 KIVA website
 The Rock of Talk KIVA Facebook

 FCC History Cards for KIVA

News and talk radio stations in the United States
IVA
Libertarian television and radio shows